Marcus Anthony Lemonis (born November 16, 1973) is a Lebanese-born American businessman, television personality and philanthropist. He is currently the chairman and CEO of Camping World, Good Sam Enterprises, Gander RV and The House Boardshop, in addition to being the star of The Profit, a CNBC reality show about saving small businesses.

Early life and education
He was born to parents Abdallel (from Lebanon) and Nadia (from Baniyas, Syria) in Beirut, Lebanon, during the chaos of the Lebanese civil war and foreign invasions. He was given the name Ricardo but was abandoned at an orphanage four days after his birth. He was adopted during his infancy on July 29, 1974, by Leo and Sophia Lemonis, a couple living in Miami, Florida. His adoptive father was Greek, and his adoptive mother was Lebanese.

Throughout his upbringing, Lemonis was exposed to the automotive industry, with his great uncle (Anthony Abraham) owning two of the largest Chevrolet dealerships in the United States. Lee Iacocca was a family friend who became a mentor to Lemonis and also a financial investor, loaning him millions to start a recreational vehicle business.

Lemonis graduated in 1991 from Christopher Columbus High School in Miami-Dade County, Florida. In 1995, he earned a bachelor's degree in political science, with a minor in criminology, from Marquette University in Milwaukee, Wisconsin. He unsuccessfully ran as a Democrat for a seat in the Florida House of Representatives shortly after his graduation, whereupon he refocused his career on the automotive industry.

Career

1996 Florida House campaign
Lemonis, appearing on the ballot as Marc Anthony Lemonis, lost to two-term Republican incumbent Bruno Barreiro, 42.44 percent to 57.56 percent. The Miami Herald called Lemonis, a Democrat, a "political neophyte" but endorsed him because "he exudes energy and ideas."

Automotive career
Lemonis worked for his great uncle's car dealership in South Florida, Anthony Abraham Chevrolet. That dealership was acquired by AutoNation in 1997, and Lemonis subsequently held several sales and managerial roles under the new ownership. A family friend, Lee Iaccoca approached Lemonis and told him he wanted to "Create the largest RV chain" as the RV business model in the United States was "fractured". Iaccoca helped Lemonis start and acquire Holiday RV Superstores. From June 2001 to February 2003 he served as CEO of Holiday RV Superstores Inc. Following that, he co-founded a company called FreedomRoads and began acquiring RV dealerships. In 2006, the company merged with Camping World with Lemonis as CEO, and then, in 2011, merged with Good Sam Enterprises, with Lemonis again at the helm.

Camping World
As the CEO of Camping World, Lemonis sponsored NASCAR driver John Andretti in 2004. In 2007, Lemonis and Camping World announced they were taking over sponsorship of the NASCAR East Series from Busch Beer for the 2008–2009 seasons, rebranding it the NASCAR Camping World Series. Later that same year, they also announced sponsorship of the then Craftsman Truck Series, rebranding it the NASCAR Camping World Truck Series, making the company one of the sport's top three sponsors. They renewed their sponsorship in 2014.

Crain's Chicago Business featured him in their 2005 edition of "40 under 40"; and in 2008, Ernst & Young named him "Entrepreneur of the Year".

In October 2016, Camping World went public on the New York Stock Exchange (NYSE: CWH) at $22 a share, giving the company a market value of approximately $2 billion. As of December 24, 2021, Camping World was trading at $39.56 per share.

In April 2017, Camping World announced the acquisition of the assets of Gander Mountain, a camping, fishing and hunting gear retailer.

In July 2017, Camping World announced the acquisition of The House Boardshop, an online retailer specializing in bikes, sailboards, skateboards, wakeboards, snowboards and outdoor gear.

Television 
Lemonis appeared on two episodes of NBC's Celebrity Apprentice. In 2012, Lemonis appeared on an episode of ABC's Secret Millionaire, returning to his hometown of Miami to help local charities.

In 2013, Lemonis became the star of the CNBC reality show The Profit, which features Lemonis on the hunt for promising yet faltering small businesses. In the show, Lemonis invests his own money for part ownership in the businesses to make them profitable.

In 2017, Lemonis starred in, and co-produced, the CNBC program The Partner, in which he searches for a business manager to assist him with running the businesses that he invests in on The Profit.

In August 2021, NBCUniversal, Machete, and Lemonis were accused of harmful business practices by over 50 small businesses that appeared on The Profit.

In 2021, it was announced that Lemonis and Nancy Glass had acquired the rights of the game show Let's Make a Deal.

In 2022, it was announced that Lemonis would star in a new HGTV show called The Renovator. The show debuted on October 11, 2022, and two episodes aired before it entered a hiatus.

Philanthrophy

Lemonis founded the Lemon-AID Foundation in 2020. The foundation supports women and minority entrepreneurs as well as small businesses. Lemonis also founded the Business Learning Center, a virtual platform for resources and business tools for those struggling as a result of the COVID-19 pandemic. Lemonis's foundation started the "Plating Change" initiative to combat food insecurity through a partnership with Grubhub and the World Central Kitchen. Lemonis has donated to his alma maters, including Christopher Columbus High School and $15Μ dollars to Marquette University. He has supported the Joffrey Ballet Bridge Program in the Chicago public school system. In 2016–17, Lemonis launched a matching campaign to support the sports program at University of Miami. After the 2020 Nashville bombing on Christmas Day, Lemonis established a fund to support the business owners affected by the event. In 2021 Lemonis gave $3.1 million to the staff of Christopher Columbus High School ($18,000 to each staff member).

Controversies

In November 2021, Pamela Perry sued Camping World, Inc. and Lemonis for Breach of Contract, after defendants made a "promise to the citizens of Nashville for information identifying" the bomber in the 2020 Nashville Christmas bombing but refused to pay. A spokesman for Lemonis replied that the reward offered was for information leading to the "capture and conviction" of the person responsible for (and killed in) the bombing.

Personal life
Lemonis married Roberta "Bobbi" Raffel in 2018 and lives in Lake Forest, Illinois.

References

External links

 

Living people
1973 births
20th-century American businesspeople
21st-century American businesspeople
American chairpersons of corporations
American retail chief executives
Marquette University alumni
Lebanese emigrants to the United States
American people of Lebanese descent
American people of Syrian descent
People from Miami
Florida Democrats
Candidates in the 1998 United States elections
Christopher Columbus High School (Miami-Dade County, Florida) alumni